Damgaard is a Danish surname. Notable people with the surname include:

Emil Damgaard (born 1998), Danish footballer
Holger Damgaard (1870–1945), Danish photographer
Jesper Damgaard (born 1975), Danish ice hockey player
Laura Damgaard (born 1996), Danish handball player
Malinda Damgaard (born 1981), Swedish milliner
Michael Damgaard (born 1990), Danish handball player
Thais Damgaard (born 2000), Danish footballer
Thomas Damgaard (born 1971), Danish boxer

See also
Hans Fuglsang-Damgaard (1890–1979), Danish Lutheran bishop
Damsgaard

Danish-language surnames